Berry College is a private liberal arts college in the Mount Berry community adjacent to Rome, Georgia. It is accredited by the Southern Association of Colleges and Schools (SACS). Berry College was founded on values based on Christian principles in 1902 by Martha Berry.

History

In 1902 Martha Berry, daughter of a prominent local business owner, founded the Boys Industrial School on 83 acres of land inherited from her father. In exchange for an education, students of the school would work to help build, run, and maintain the new school. In 1909, the Martha Berry School for Girls was added, and collectively with the boys school became known as the Berry Schools. The free labor provided by the students helped to keep construction and operating costs for the schools low. In 1926 the school became a junior college and several years later a senior college, graduating its first class in 1932. During the 1930s the school campus grew to 30,000 acres, helped by a large donation from Henry Ford. In 1957, Berry College became accredited by the SACS. During the 1960s, Berry College began paying student workers instead of crediting accounts and ended mandatory religious services for students.

Campus

The campus consists of more than 27,000 acres of land - including fields, forests, and Lavender Mountain - making it the largest contiguous college campus in the world. Designated portions are open to the public for hiking, cycling, horseback riding, and other outdoor activities. The campus is also home to a large population of deer (estimates range between 1,500 and 2,500).

The Georgia Department of Natural Resources oversees about 16,000 acres of the campus, conducts managed hunts, and provides recreational opportunities. The land encompassing the academic buildings and other public spaces is a wildlife refuge in which no hunting is allowed. In September 2011, Travel+Leisure ranked Berry among the most beautiful college campuses in the United States, noting its numerous fountains and pools among its English Gothic-style buildings.

Academics

Berry College offers Bachelor of Arts, Bachelor of Music, Bachelor of Science, Master of Business Administration, Master of Education, and Education Specialist degrees from the four schools making up its academic program. It is accredited by the Southern Association of Colleges and Schools (SACS) and is a member of the Annapolis Group, an organization of more than 120 liberal arts colleges nationwide. The student-faculty ratio at Berry College is 11:1, and the school has 58.9% of its classes with fewer than 20 students, and with 99.6% of its classes with fewer than 50 students. The average freshman retention rate, an indicator of student satisfaction, is 83%. U.S. News & World Report in its 2021 Best Colleges ranks Berry College #4 in Regional Universities South, #3 in Best Undergraduate Teaching, and #1 in Best Value Schools.

Undergraduate programs
Berry offers degrees in the following schools:
 Campbell School of Business
 Charter School of Education and Human Sciences
 Evans School of Humanities, Arts and Social Sciences
 School of Mathematical and Natural Sciences

A minor degree can be obtained in 36 different courses of study throughout the four schools. Berry also offers an undergraduate degree in interdisciplinary studies.

Honors Program

Berry's Honors Program is an undergraduate program designed to give qualified students a chance to learn in an intellectually challenging environment with their peers and professors. The Honors Program allows the students to take Honors-only classes, Honorized classes, and to study abroad in Honors-only programs. During their last year at Berry, Honors students must complete and defend a senior thesis. Upon graduation, they receive an Honors diploma.

Graduate programs

Berry offers a Master of Arts in Teaching program and an Education Specialist certification in the Charter School of Education and Human Sciences that is accredited by the National Council for Teacher Education (NCATE).

The Campbell School of Business offers a Master of Business Administration program that is accredited by the Association to Advance Collegiate Schools of Business (AACSB).

Admissions 
In 2021, Berry College accepted 77% of all applicants. Admitted students have an average GPA of 3.7, a mean ACT score of 27 and a mean SAT score of 1175.

Tuition 
Berry College's tuition is $38,430 a year, before any financial aid, grants, or scholarships. In 2021, tuition increased 1.9%, from $37,720 in 2020 to the current rate of $38,430.  On average, college tuition rises about 3 percent a year.

Berry College has the same tuition for Georgia residents as for students from other states, and international students.

In addition to tuition, students at Berry can expect to pay around $13,620 a year for room and board, which covers the cost of on campus housing and a meal plan. Students who live off campus but still want to eat on campus can pay $6,180 a year for a meal plan.

Academic Success Center
The Academic Success Center is located in the Memorial Library at Berry and is open to all Berry students who need academic assistance. It provides free student tutoring services to any student who requests it, and provides academic accommodations to students who have a documented disability. It also offers time management and study skills counseling in a one-on-one setting to Berry students.

Berry College Elementary and Middle School
Berry College Elementary and Middle School is a private school located on Berry College's mountain campus across from Frost Chapel. Established in 1977, the school was initially called the Berry College Academy - which held a variety of students from preschool to high school. The academy was meant to follow British enfant school practices. Using a Lilly Foundation Grant, the school was called the Early Learning Center in the Westcott Building and taught kindergarten and first grade students. Furthermore, the high school students were engaged in Bible study.

Berry abruptly closed the academy in 1983, and all 144 students left to attend school elsewhere. In 1988, the school moved locations from the Westcott Building to Hamrick Hall, where it is now located. By this time the age range had expanded to teach children up until fifth grade. Since 2002, it has enrolled students in up to the eighth grade. A year later, the older students were moved from Hamrick Hall to the newly built Cook Building on Main Campus to form their own separate middle school. A series of reunion events were held for former students, parents, teachers and directors in 2007 for the thirty year anniversary. The names of the schools were merged into one, Berry College Elementary and Middle School.

Currently, the school is home to 129 elementary and middle school students with a 1:12 teacher to student ratio. During the 180 days in the school year, the students attend class for seven hours compared to the normal six for other elementary schools in the area. The Middle Schoolers were also known for annually producing short films, with the eight graders receiving a "Martha" award for their achievements.

Student life
Berry College has a total of 1,943 undergraduate students for the 2019–2020 academic year. There are 91 graduate students. There is a 66:34 female to male ratio, and 69 percent of the students are in-state residents. Students come from 35 states and at least 18 foreign countries.

Outdoor recreation
Berry College has more than 80 miles of hiking, biking and horseback riding trails, and two disc golf courses; all are open to the Berry community and to the public. The Victory Lake Campground located in the heart of Berry's campus is available to Berry student use only. Berry offers an intramural program with men, women and co-educational play for many sports.

LifeWorks program
Berry College's student work program, called LifeWorks, guarantees every student a job on campus for those interested in participating. The work program is based upon the original idea the school was formed around. The founder, Martha Berry, would educate local children for free if they would work around campus. This continues to help offset the tuition cost to this day. This program creates the opportunity for real work experience to build their resumes and apply their particular academic interests. Students are paid based on the level (1–5) at which they work. Level 1 workers are typically just starting at their jobs and are paid $9 per hour. As students move up in experience and leadership, they move up in levels and are paid slightly more with each level. The maximum number of hours a student can work each week depends on their grade. Freshmen are limited to 10 hours a week. Sophomores and above can work from 12 to 16 hours a week based upon scholarship or other stipulations.

Film and television
Berry College has been used as a site for the filming of several movies, in addition to music videos by bands such as Casting Crowns. The most notable films are Remember the Titans and Sweet Home Alabama. Disney's Perfect Harmony (1991) was filmed almost entirely on campus at buildings such as Oak Hill, Frost Chapel, the Old Mill, and the Ford Buildings. A short scene from Dutch was filmed on the Berry campus. In addition, scenes for the new series, The Following, starring Kevin Bacon, were filmed here. In the Constantine television series, the Ford Buildings and the Old Mill were used as the settings for Ravenscar Asylum and John Constantine's hideout, respectively. The Netflix Original Stranger Things filmed parts of its fourth season at the Ford Complex.

Religious life
Berry College's mission statement espouses "values based on Christian principles."  The college board chose to shutter the middle and high school academy, and used that campus property to court leadership of Chick Fil-A, a Christian-run business, through its WinShape foundation programs.  The campus has a chaplain, four chapels, and an active religion-in-life program supporting all Christian denominations and religions outside of Christianity. The school recognizes the Student Association for an Inter-Religious Community, which is a student organization that encourages dialogue between religions represented on campus.

Campus housing
The college has housing for employees.

Faculty housing on the Berry College property is zoned to Floyd County School District for public school (for dependents of college employees living on the property). The zoned secondary schools for Berry College's housing are Armuchee Middle School and Armuchee High School.

Athletics
The Berry athletic teams are called the Vikings. The college is a member of the Division III level of the National Collegiate Athletic Association (NCAA), primarily competing in the Southern Athletic Association (SAA) as a founding member since the 2012–13 academic year. The Vikings previously competed as an NCAA D-III Independent from 2010–11 to 2011–12; and in the Southern States Athletic Conference (SSAC; formerly known as Georgia–Alabama–Carolina Conference (GACC) until after the 2003–04 school year) of the National Association of Intercollegiate Athletics (NAIA) from 2004–05 to 2009–10. The school's mascot is the Viking.

Berry competes in 22 intercollegiate varsity sports: Men's sports include baseball, basketball, cross country, football, golf, lacrosse, soccer, swimming & diving, tennis and track & field; while women's sports include basketball, beach volleyball, cross country, equestrian, golf, lacrosse, soccer, softball, swimming & diving, tennis, track & field and volleyball.

Championships
Berry has won three NAIA national championships in women's soccer (1987, 1990 and 1993), one national title in women's basketball (1976), one NAIA national crown in men's golf (1998), and three IHSA national championships in equestrian (2011, 2015, 2016). In addition, Berry student-athletes Michelle Abernathy (marathon, 1999), Caio Soares (3,000 meter race-walk, 2004), Michelle Tuggle (high jump, 1984) and Nicole Wildes (women's golf, 2004) have all won individual national championships. The Berry College women's basketball team won the AIAW Small College National Championship in 1976.

In 2018 Elijah Hirsh in men's basketball broke the single-game record for blocks in Berry's NCAA DIII era with 10 blocks. In 2019 he averaged 9.2 rebounds (leading the SAA), and was named SAA Player of the Year, SAA All-First Team, and National Association of Basketball Coaches All-District South First Team.

Addition of football
The Berry College Board of Trustees voted to add football beginning in the fall of 2013, with a track and field athletic program to be added soon after. Due to the financial expense and the traditions of the school, the decision to add football was controversial and met with opposition from a significant portion of the student body, faculty, and alumni. According to the school newspaper, The Campus Carrier, adding football will not affect issues related to equal sports opportunity under the Title IX regulations.

Facilities

A new stadium, known as "Valhalla", has been built on Berry's campus. The facility is used by the college's football, track, and lacrosse programs.

The stadium was originally intended to be built near the Cage Center, but in 2012 a pair of bald eagles established their nest near the site. They returned and successfully raised chicks in 2013 and 2014. The school moved the stadium site to a new location well removed from the eagles, which have become a symbol of the school. Groundbreaking was held on October 17, 2014, and the stadium was completed for the 2015 football season.

The Cage Center is Berry's 131,000-square-foot athletic facility that houses a performance gymnasium, a natatorium with observation seating, a fitness center, racquetball courts, an indoor track and classrooms. The Cage was named after Berry College alumnus and trustee Steven Cage, whose $10 million donation kicked off the project.

Alumni
 Mark Bloom, professional soccer player
 Elijah Hirsh, professional basketball player
 Josh Hughes, professional soccer player
 Collin McHugh, professional baseball player
 Heather Willauer, chemist and inventor

Demographics

Berry College CDP is a census-designated place (CDP) and the official name for an area covering the Berry College campus, in Floyd County, Georgia, United States. 

It first appeared as a CDP in the 2020 Census with a population of 1,565.

2020 census

Note: the US Census treats Hispanic/Latino as an ethnic category. This table excludes Latinos from the racial categories and assigns them to a separate category. Hispanics/Latinos can be of any race.

See also 

 Georgia Governor's Honors Program

References

External links

 
 Official athletics website
 Historical markers:
 Berry College 
 Berry Schools' Old Mill
 Original Cabin

 
Buildings and structures in Floyd County, Georgia
Education in Floyd County, Georgia
Educational institutions established in 1902
Liberal arts colleges in Georgia (U.S. state)
Protected areas of Floyd County, Georgia
Universities and colleges accredited by the Southern Association of Colleges and Schools
Private universities and colleges in Georgia (U.S. state)
Historic districts on the National Register of Historic Places in Georgia (U.S. state)
Private elementary schools in Georgia (U.S. state)
Private middle schools in Georgia (U.S. state)
Schools in Floyd County, Georgia
National Register of Historic Places in Floyd County, Georgia
1902 establishments in Georgia (U.S. state)
Census-designated places in Georgia (U.S. state)